The Australian Information Commissioner is an independent statutory office-holder in Australia, appointed under subsection 14(1) of the Australian Information Commissioner Act 2010 and operating within the Attorney-General's portfolio.

The Australian Information Commissioner heads the Office of the Australian Information Commissioner, and has functions relating to freedom of information, privacy and information policy.

Professor John McMillan was the first Australian Information Commissioner, appointed in 2010.

Commissioners

References

External links
Office of the Australian Information Commissioner website

Commonwealth Government agencies of Australia
2010 establishments in Australia